Netty Probst  (1903–1990) was a Luxembourgian lawyer. She was the first female lawyer in Luxembourg.

She was the daughter of the lawyer and social democrat Jean-Pierre Probst, and graduated in law at the university. When she was to pass the qualifications as a lawyer in 1927, she was initially refused because of her gender. After protests from her male colleagues, however, she was allowed to pass, which is regarded as a great victory in the history of gender equality in Luxembourg. As a lawyer, she often defended females and handled divorce cases. In 1939, she proved that the common practice to fire a female teacher after marriage was illegal.

References
 Jeanne Rouff, Un office essentiellement viril' : Les premières femmes au barreau de Luxembourg", in : Goetzinger / Lorang / Wagener, Wenn nun wir Frauen auch das Wort ergreifen, p. 209ff.
 Renée Wagener, "Bye bye, Siegfried. Der lange Abschied der Luxemburger Frauen vom Patriarchat", in: Not the girl you’re looking for. Melusina Rediscovered, Luxembourg, 2010, p. 230f.

1903 births
1990 deaths
Luxembourgian women's rights activists
Luxembourgian feminists
20th-century Luxembourgian women